The Joliet Slammers are a professional baseball team based in Joliet, Illinois, that play in the independent Frontier League. They play their home games at Duly Health and Care Field. They replaced the Joliet JackHammers of the Northern League after the franchise was crippled by numerous financial issues. The JackHammers franchise was put up for sale and Steel City Baseball, LLC, bought out all assets, including the front office, the ticketing system, and the lease of the ballpark. The company behind the popular card game Cards Against Humanity announced in December 2017 that they had purchased the naming rights to the stadium, calling it the "Cards Against Humanity Baseball Place", but the company's claim has been disputed by Slammers management.

The "Slammers" name refers to the famous prisons of Joliet and Will County (Joliet Correctional Center and Stateville Correctional Center) as well as a common baseball term.

On September 18, 2011, the Slammers were named Frontier League champions after defeating the River City Rascals, 6–5 in Joliet, taking the best-of-five Frontier League championship series three games to one.

Following the 2012 season, the Slammers were purchased on October 15, 2012, by Joliet Community Baseball & Entertainment, LLC. The team's name, stadium, league, and overall branding remained the same.

Season-by-season records

Single season records
Statistics as of the completion of the 2022 season

Offensive
Hits: 135.....Grant DeBruin, 2013
Doubles: 29.....Grant DeBruin/Carter Bell, 2012/2016
Triples: 6.....Josh Flores, 2011
Homeruns: 23.....Justin Garcia, 2018
RBIs: 77.....Erik Lis, 2011
Walks: 57.....Russell Moldenhauer, 2014
Stolen Bases: 35.....Josh Flores, 2011

Pitching
Wins: 13.....Jake Renshaw, 2011
Strikeouts: 122.....Daren Osby, 2019
Saves: 28.....Ryan Quigley, 2011

Franchise leaders
Statistics as of the completion of the 2022 season

Offensive
Games played
1. Kyle Manus...248 (2011–2013)
2. Brylie Ware...193 (2020–2022)
3. Alfredo Rodriguez...192 (2015–2016)

Hits
1. Brylie Ware...211 (2020–2022)
2. Kyle Manus...205 (2011-2013)
2. Alfredo Rodriguez...205 (2015–2016)
3. Grant DeBruin...196 (2013–2014)

Doubles
1. Brylie Ware...45 (2020–2022)
2. Kyle Manus…43 (2011–2013) 
3. Grant DeBruin…41 (2013–2014)

Triples
1. Josh Flores…6 (2011)
2. Marquis Riley...5 (2013–2014)
2. Mike Garza...5 (2015–2016)
2. Matt McGarry...5 (2020, 2022–present)

Home Runs
1. Kyle Manus...32 (2011–2013)
2. Erik Lis...28 (2011–2012)
3. Justin Garcia...23 (2018)

RBI
1. Kyle Manus...128 (2011–2013)
2. Erik Lis...122 (2011–2012)
3. Danny Zardon...110 (2017–2018)
3. Brylie Ware...110 (2020–2022)

Stolen Bases
1. London Lindley...53 (2018–2019)
2. Charlie White...48 (2015–2016)
3. Josh Flores...35 (2011)

Pitching
Innings Pitched
1. Cameron Aufderheide...274.0 (2020–present)
2. Liam O’Sullivan...246.1 (2016, 2018)
3. Daren Osby...177.2 (2018-2019) 

Strikeouts
1. Cameron Aufderheide...212 (2020–present)
2. Liam O’Sullivan...186 (2016, 2018)
3. Daren Osby...176 (2018-2019)

Wins
1. Liam O’Sullivan...22 (2016, 2018)
2. Jake Renshaw...14  (2011–2012)
2. Scot Hoffman...14 (2017–2019)
3. Kevin McNorton...12  (2014–2017)
3. Cameron Aufderheide...12 (2020–present)

Saves
1. Ryan Quigley...28 (2011)
2. Ryan Koziol...23 (2019)
3. Trevor Charpie...21 (2020–present)

Current Roster

Notable alumni
Several notable players have competed for the Slammers; years in parentheses are seasons when the player was with the team.

 Billy Petrick (2011)
 Jake Sanchez (2012–2013)
 Kaleb Ort (2016–2017)
 Joe Ortiz (2017)
 Dietrich Enns (2020)
 Mitch Glasser (2020)
 Ian Krol (2020)
 Bubby Rossman (2020)
 Brock Stewart (2020)
 Charlie Tilson (2020)
 Braxton Davidson (2021)
 Nick Lovullo (2021)
 Tyler Jay (2022–present)

Kaleb Ort became the first Joliet Slammers player to make it to the MLB.  He made his major league debut on September 13, 2021 as a member of the Boston Red Sox in a game against the Seattle Mariners.

Dietrich Enns had previously played for the Minnesota Twins in the 2017 season. He has moved around the Twins', Padres', and Rays' minor league teams before coming to Joliet due to the COVID-19 pandemic.

Enns was picked up by the Tampa Bay Rays after pitching just 18 innings for the Joliet Tully Monsters in the City of Champions Cup, a four-team league hosted by the Joliet Slammers. Enns was called up to the Rays in the 2021 season.

References

External links
 Official website
 Frontier League website
 Team Statistics and Rosters

2010 establishments in Illinois
Baseball teams in Chicago
Frontier League teams
Professional baseball teams in Illinois
Slammers
Baseball teams established in 2010